Sorolopha semifulva is a species of moth of the family Tortricidae. It is found in India (Assam) and western Malaysia and possibly the Philippines (Negros).

References

Moths described in 1908
Olethreutini
Moths of Asia